Sebastián Decoud and Miguel Ángel López Jaén were the defending champions but decided not to participate this year.
Adil Shamasdin and Lovro Zovko defeated Carlos Berlocq and Rubén Ramírez Hidalgo 1–6, 7–6(9), [10–5] in the final.

Seeds

Draw

Draw
{{16TeamBracket-Compact-Tennis3-Byes
| RD1=First round
| RD2=Quarterfinals
| RD3=Semifinals
| RD4=Finals

| RD1-seed01=1
| RD1-team01= A Shamasdin L Zovko
| RD1-score01-1=6
| RD1-score01-2=6
| RD1-score01-3= 
| RD1-seed02= 
| RD1-team02= F Škugor A Veić
| RD1-score02-1=1
| RD1-score02-2=2
| RD1-score02-3= 

| RD1-seed03= 
| RD1-team03= A Brizzi D Junqueira
| RD1-score03-1=6
| RD1-score03-2=2
| RD1-score03-3=[7]
| RD1-seed04= 
| RD1-team04= A Martin M Mečíř Jr.
| RD1-score04-1=4
| RD1-score04-2=6
| RD1-score04-3=[10]

| RD1-seed05=4
| RD1-team05= D Molchanov D Sitak
| RD1-score05-1=3
| RD1-score05-2=4
| RD1-score05-3= 
| RD1-seed06=ALT
| RD1-team06=
| RD1-score06-1=6
| RD1-score06-2=6
| RD1-score06-3= 

| RD1-seed07=WC
| RD1-team07= I Cerović C-M Stebe
| RD1-score07-1=4
| RD1-score07-2=4
| RD1-score07-3= 
| RD1-seed08=WC
| RD1-team08= M Draganja D Marcan
| RD1-score08-1=6
| RD1-score08-2=6
| RD1-score08-3= 

| RD1-seed09= 
| RD1-team09= A Balázs A Hadad
| RD1-score09-1=3
| RD1-score09-2=2
| RD1-score09-3= 
| RD1-seed10= 
| RD1-team10= N Mektić I Zovko
| RD1-score10-1=6
| RD1-score10-2=6
| RD1-score10-3= 

| RD1-seed11= 
| RD1-team11= S Galvani M Viola
| RD1-score11-1=0
| RD1-score11-2=65
| RD1-score11-3= 
| RD1-seed12=3
| RD1-team12= I Belyaev D Savić
| RD1-score12-1=6
| RD1-score12-2=7
| RD1-score12-3= 

| RD1-seed13=ALT
| RD1-team13= T Androić M Milan
| RD1-score13-1= 
| RD1-score13-2= 
| RD1-score13-3= 
| RD1-seed14= 
| RD1-team14= M Bachinger D Kindlmann
| RD1-score14-1=w/o
| RD1-score14-2= 
| RD1-score14-3= 

| RD1-seed15= 
| RD1-team15= A Pehar M Ružić
| RD1-score15-1=2
| RD1-score15-2=1
| RD1-score15-3= 
| RD1-seed16=2
| RD1-team16=
| RD1-score16-1=6
| RD1-score16-2=6
| RD1-score16-3= 

| RD2-seed01=1
| RD2-team01= A Shamasdin L Zovko
| RD2-score01-1=6
| RD2-score01-2=7
| RD2-score01-3= 
| RD2-seed02= 
| RD2-team02= A Martin M Mečíř Jr.
| RD2-score02-1=2
| RD2-score02-2=5
| RD2-score02-3= 

| RD2-seed03=ALT
| RD2-team03=
| RD2-score03-1=2
| RD2-score03-2=2
| RD2-score03-3= 
| RD2-seed04=WC
| RD2-team04= M Draganja D Marcan
| RD2-score04-1=6
| RD2-score04-2=6
| RD2-score04-3= 

| RD2-seed05= 
| RD2-team05= N Mektić I Zovko
| RD2-score05-1=62
| RD2-score05-2=2
| RD2-score05-3= 
| RD2-seed06=3
| RD2-team06= I Belyaev D Savić
| RD2-score06-1=7
| RD2-score06-2=6
| RD2-score06-3= 

| RD2-seed07=ALT
| RD2-team07= T Androić M Milan
| RD2-score07-1=64
| RD2-score07-2=3
| RD2-score07-3= 
| RD2-seed08=2
| RD2-team08={{Nowrap| C Berlocq R Ramírez Hidalgo}}
| RD2-score08-1=7| RD2-score08-2=6| RD2-score08-3= 

| RD3-seed01=1
| RD3-team01= A Shamasdin L Zovko| RD3-score01-1=2
| RD3-score01-2=7| RD3-score01-3=[10]| RD3-seed02=WC
| RD3-team02= M Draganja D Marcan
| RD3-score02-1=6'''
| RD3-score02-2=5
| RD3-score02-3=[4]

| RD3-seed03=3
| RD3-team03= I Belyaev D Savić
| RD3-score03-1=1
| RD3-score03-2=0
| RD3-score03-3= 
| RD3-seed04=2
| RD3-team04=

References
 Doubles Draw

Rijeka Open - Doubles
Rijeka Open